The 1978–79 Maltese First Division was the 64th season of top-tier football in Malta.  It was contested by 10 teams, and Hibernians F.C. won the championship.

Group A

Group B

Championship group

Relegation group

References
Malta – List of final tables (RSSSF)

Maltese Premier League seasons
Malta
1